The Qaransoor Party is a Somali political party, founded on March 15, 2020. Qaransoor (Q) Party wants to implement a new Political Reform in Somalia, to come up with ideas and activities that promote the national interest, especially intending to gain and sustain the nationhood of Somalia.

Background and Party's vision 
The Qaransoor Party received its party certificate from Independent National Electoral Commission (NIEC) chairperson Marbo Halima Ismail Ibrahim at NIEC headquarters in Mogadishu on October 7, 2020. Mohamed Aden Afrah is the current general secretary and Abdijabar Sheikh Ahmed Jibril is the current chairman.

Vision

The party's vision is a nation capable of self-sufficiency in both its economy and security, the development of the intelligence and military sectors, fighting against extremism, and the building of an education system based on academic and religious qualifications.

Constitution 
The party has a written constitution. A key part of the constitution is that the nation must participate in the restoration of Somali statehood, as well as political and social reform. According to the constitution, members must be healthy Somalians who fulfill the requirements of the charter. Membership cannot be handed down to another person. The full list of members is currently not available to the public.

See also 

 Political parties in Somalia

External links 

 Official website
 Facebook page
 Twitter page
 YouTube page

References 

Political parties in Somalia
Political parties established in 2020
2020 establishments in Somalia